Chief Red Fox (Lakota: Tokála Luta, also known as Chief William Red Fox; June 11, 1870 – March 1, 1976) was an Oglala Lakota Sioux performer, actor, and Sioux Indian rights advocate, born on the Pine Ridge Reservation in the Dakota Territory. He was a nephew of famed Sioux war leader, Crazy Horse.

Participation in Buffalo Bill's Wild West show
In 1893, Colonel William Frederick Cody, better known as Buffalo Bill, visited Pine Ridge Reservation to recruit Native Americans as performers in his Wild West show. He met Chief Red Fox and asked him to join the troupe of performers who were about to make an appearance at the 1893 World's Columbian Exposition, also known as the Chicago World's Fair. Chief Red Fox was asked to serve as a translator and "have charge" of the Native Americans who were in the troupe. Red Fox agreed and worked for Buffalo Bill for many years, not just translating, but also acting in the show. In 1905, Chief Red Fox "scalped" King Edward VII in a stagecoach robbery scene in a Wild West show performance in London.

In popular culture 

Chief Red Fox appeared in many early silent westerns shown in Nickelodeon movie theaters, most notably The Round Up.

Chief Red Fox appeared in:

 War on the Plains
 When the Heart Calls
 Daughters of the Tribe
 Toll of the Warpath
 Red Fox and Wild Flower
 Perils of the Plains
 Medicine Boy
 The Covered Wagon
 The Vanishing American
 Desert Gold
 The Wild Horse Massacre
 The Flaming Arrow
 The Law of Crippled Creek
 The Round Up

References

1870 births
1976 deaths
Oglala people
20th-century American male actors